Álvaro Francisco Nájera Gil (born 25 July 1983) is a Colombian footballer who plays for La Equidad of Colombian First Division.

He played the 2006/2007 season in Mexico for Querétaro; the team failed to stay in México Primera División football, after which he returned to Colombia.

Career statistics

Honours

Club
Club Olimpia
 Paraguayan Primera División (1): 2011 Clausura
Atlético Nacional
 Categoría Primera A (3): 2013-I, 2013-II, 2014-I
 Copa Colombia (2): 2012, 2013
 Superliga Colombiana (1): 2012

Club performance

Statistics accurate as of last match played on 26 November 2016.

1 Includes cup competitions such as Copa Libertadores and Copa Sudamericana.

2 Includes Superliga Colombiana matches.

References

External links
 
 
 

1983 births
Living people
Colombian footballers
Colombia international footballers
Colombian expatriate footballers
Independiente Santa Fe footballers
Once Caldas footballers
Querétaro F.C. footballers
Club Olimpia footballers
Unión Española footballers
Atlético Nacional footballers
La Equidad footballers
Expatriate footballers in Chile
Expatriate footballers in Mexico
Expatriate footballers in Paraguay
Categoría Primera A players
Chilean Primera División players
Liga MX players
Paraguayan Primera División players
Colombian expatriate sportspeople in Chile
Association football central defenders
Footballers from Bogotá